Gianluca Caprari (born 30 July 1993) is an Italian professional footballer who plays as a forward for  club Monza, on loan from Hellas Verona. He also represents the Italy national team.

Club career

Roma
Born in Rome, Italian capital, Caprari started his career at Atletico 2000. He then joined esordienti  team of A.S. Roma in 2003. He played for Roma's Allievi Nazionali team at 2010 Torneo Città di Arco, which beat Fiorentina in the final.

Caprari made his first team debut on 8 March 2011, in 2010–11 UEFA Champions League round of 16. He replaced Simone Perrotta in the last minute; his team lost to Shakhtar Donetsk with a 0–3 score.

In the next season he played both legs of the 2011–12 UEFA Europa League play-off round, losing to Slovan Bratislava. He played only one match in Serie A in 2011–12 season, substituting Totti in a 2–0 win over Chievo.

Pescara
In January 2012, Caprari was sent on loan to Serie B club Pescara in order to allow him to play more first-team football. He scored three goals in 15 matches in 2011–12 season. The club also won promotion to Serie A.

In June 2012 Pescara purchased Caprari in a co-ownership deal for €1.2 million. On 20 June 2013, Roma re-signed him for €2 million by means of a player swap, with Giammario Piscitella and Matteo Politano moving to Pescara for €2 million. Caprari played his first match of his second Roma career on 10 November 2013, against Sassuolo coming on as a substitute.

On 24 January 2014, Caprari returned to Pescara by swapped clubs with Piscitella (both were tagged for €1.5 million)

On 27 June 2015, Roma bought back Politano for €601,000, with Caprari moving to Pescara outright for €125,000.

Inter Milan and Sampdoria
On 8 July 2016, Caprari was sold to Inter Milan, in a deal involving Cristiano Biraghi moving the other way. He was sent back on loan to Pescara.

Sampdoria
On 30 June 2017, Caprari joined fellow Serie A club Sampdoria. On 4 November 2019, Gianluca Caprari came off the bench to score the only goal and a stoppage-time winner for Sampdoria against SPAL.

Parma (loan)
On 31 January 2020, Caprari joined Parma on loan with an option to buy.

Benevento (loan)
On 4 September 2020, Caprari joined Benevento on loan until 30 June 2021.

Hellas Verona
On 31 August 2021, Caprari joined Hellas Verona on loan with an option to buy and a conditional obligation to buy. During the 2021–22 season, he scored 12 goals and made 7 assists in the Serie A.

Monza (loan)
On 21 July 2022, Caprari joined newly-promoted Serie A side Monza on a one-year loan, with a conditional obligation to buy. He made his debut on 8 August, scoring a penalty in a 3–2 Coppa Italia win against Frosinone. Caprari's first Serie A goal for Monza was a volley in a 3–0 away win to Sampdoria on 2 October.

International career
Caprari was called up to the Italy senior squad for the 2022 Finalissima against Argentina on 1 June 2022, and for 2022–23 UEFA Nations League group stage matches against Germany, Hungary, England and Germany between 4 and 14 June. He made his debut against Germany on 14 June.

Career statistics

Club

References

External links

 Profile at A.C. Monza 
 
 
 
 

Living people
1993 births
Footballers from Rome
Association football forwards
Italian footballers
A.S. Roma players
Delfino Pescara 1936 players
Inter Milan players
U.C. Sampdoria players
Parma Calcio 1913 players
Benevento Calcio players
Hellas Verona F.C. players
A.C. Monza players
Serie A players
Serie B players
Italy youth international footballers
Italy international footballers